Pogorelets is a rural locality (a village) in Kozmogorodskoye Rural Settlement of Mezensky District, Arkhangelsk Oblast, Russia. The population was 32 as of 2010. There are 4 streets.

Geography 
Pogorelets is located on the Mezen River, 71 km southeast of Mezen (the district's administrative centre) by road. Bereznik is the nearest rural locality.

References 

Rural localities in Mezensky District